Steven Hyden (born September 7, 1977) is an American music critic, author, and podcast host. He is the author of the books Your Favorite Band Is Killing Me (2016, on rivalries in pop music history), Twilight of the Gods (2018, on the history of classic rock), Hard to Handle (2019, co-authored with Steve Gorman about The Black Crowes), and This Isn't Happening (2020, about Radiohead's Kid A). He co-hosts the podcasts Indiecast (with Ian Cohen) and 36 From the Vault (with Rob Mitchum) and previously hosted the podcasts Rivals, Break Stuff: The Story of Woodstock '99, and Celebration Rock. He is a critic for Uproxx and previously served as staff writer at Grantland and an editor at The A.V. Club.

Early life 
Steven Hyden was born on September 7, 1977 in Wisconsin. He graduated from Appleton East High School, then the University of Wisconsin-Eau Claire in 2000.

Career
Hyden began his career with The Post-Crescent in 1993; then 15 years old, he contributed to a weekly section for teenagers (his first submission, hand-written, was a review of the 1993 album Zooropa by U2). He continued working for the paper as an intern while in college, and then joined the staff as a full-time reporter when he graduated in 2000.

He joined UPROXX as a cultural critic in July 2016. He previously worked at Grantland as a staff writer and at The A.V. Club as an editor. His music criticism has been published in several other outlets including Pitchfork, Rolling Stone, Slate, American Songwriter and Salon.com.

Podcasts

Celebration Rock
From January 2016 - December 2018, Hyden hosted the Celebration Rock podcast. A new episode debuted weekly on Monday afternoon and usually ran about 50–60 minutes in length. Hyden and his guests covered topics ranging from "Best Rock Albums of the '10's (so far)" to hour-long interviews with artists (Rick Nielsen of Cheap Trick, Deftones) and hosting other critics to discuss their famous works. The podcast mostly emphasized the current rock scene, but also dove into the past with episodes and interviews about The Replacements, Cheap Trick, and others.

Break Stuff: The Story of Woodstock '99
From July 9, 2019 to August 27, 2019, Hyden hosted an eight episode podcast about the Woodstock '99 festival on the subscription podcast network Luminary. He later appeared as an expert on the HBO documentary Woodstock 99: Peace, Love, And Rage.

Rivals
From February 6, 2020 to January 27, 2021, Hyden co-hosted Rivals, a podcast about rivalries between band-mates and contemporaries in rock, with Jordan Runtaugh.

Indiecast
In July 2020, Hyden began co-hosting Indiecast, a podcast about indie music news and trends, with Ian Cohen.

36 From the Vault
In January 2020, Hyden began co-hosting 36 From the Vault, a podcast about the Grateful Dead's live album series Dick's Picks, with co-host Rob Mitchum.

Books

Inventory
In 2009, Hyden was a co-author of the book Inventory: 16 Films Featuring Manic Pixie Dream Girls, 10 Great Songs Nearly Ruined by Saxophone, and 100 More Obsessively Specific Pop-Culture Lists, a collection of lists from The A.V. Club.

Whatever Happened to Alternative Nation? 
In 2011, Hyden published the e-book Whatever Happened To Alternative Nation?, a critical analysis and personal reflection on 1990s alternative rock that originally ran as a 10-part series at The A.V. Club.

Your Favorite Band Is Killing Me
On May 17, 2016 Hyden released Your Favorite Band Is Killing Me, published by Back Bay Books. It is a collection of essays on famous pop music rivalries throughout rock history, including Oasis versus Blur, Beatles versus Rolling Stones, and Madonna versus Cyndi Lauper.

Twilight of the Gods
On May 1, 2018, Hyden published Twilight of the Gods: A Journey to the End of Classic Rock. The 19-chapter book is structured to resemble a double-LP, with "tracks" divided among four "sides".

Hard to Handle: The Life and Death of the Black Crowes
On September 24, 2019, Hyden published Hard to Handle: The Life and Death of the Black Crowes with co-author Steve Gorman about the latter's time as the drummer in the American rock band The Black Crowes.

This Isn't Happening: Radiohead's "Kid A" and the Beginning of the 21st Century
On September 29, 2020, Hyden published This Isn't Happening: Radiohead's "Kid A" and the Beginning of the 21st Century about Radiohead's 2000 album Kid A and its broader cultural context and influence.

Long Road: Pearl Jam and the Soundtrack of a Generation
Hyden's Long Road: Pearl Jam and the Soundtrack of a Generation, was published by Hachette Books on September 27, 2022. AllMusic interviewed Hyden about his publication and enquired about Pearl Jam's decision to release a number of 2000 live shows.

Personal life
Hyden is married and lives in Minneapolis.

References

Living people
Writers from Wisconsin
American music critics
University of Wisconsin–Eau Claire alumni
1977 births
21st-century American non-fiction writers
People from Appleton, Wisconsin
Appleton East High School alumni